AbdullahI bin Al-Hussein (2 February 1882 – 20 July 1951) was the ruler of Jordan from 11 April 1921 until his assassination in 1951. He was the Emir of Transjordan, a British protectorate, until 25 May 1946, after which he was king of an independent Jordan. As a member of the Hashemite dynasty, the royal family of Jordan since 1921, Abdullah was a 38th-generation direct descendant of Muhammad.

Born in Mecca, Hejaz, Ottoman Empire, Abdullah was the second of four sons of Hussein bin Ali, Sharif of Mecca, and his first wife, Abdiyya bint Abdullah. He was educated in Istanbul and Hejaz. From 1909 to 1914, Abdullah sat in the Ottoman legislature, as deputy for Mecca, but allied with Britain during World War I. During the war, he played a key role in secret negotiations with the United Kingdom that led to the Great Arab Revolt against Ottoman rule that was led by his father Sharif Hussein. Abdullah personally led guerrilla raids on garrisons.

Abdullah became emir of Transjordan in April 1921. He upheld his alliance with the British during World War II, and became king after Transjordan gained independence from the United Kingdom in 1946. In 1949, Jordan annexed the West Bank, which angered Arab countries including Syria, Saudi Arabia and Egypt, which all defended the creation of a Palestinian state. He was assassinated in Jerusalem while attending Friday prayers at the entrance of the Al-Aqsa Mosque by a nationalist Palestinian in 1951. He was succeeded by his eldest son Talal.

Early political career

In 1910, Abdullah persuaded his father to stand, successfully, for Grand Sharif of Mecca, a post for which Hussein acquired British support. In the following year, he became deputy for Mecca in the parliament established by the Young Turks, acting as an intermediary between his father and the Ottoman government. In 1914, Abdullah paid a clandestine visit to Cairo to meet Lord Kitchener to seek British support for his father's ambitions in Arabia.

Abdullah maintained contact with the British throughout the First World War and in 1915 encouraged his father to enter into correspondence with Sir Henry McMahon, British high commissioner in Egypt, about Arab independence from Turkish rule. (see McMahon–Hussein Correspondence). This correspondence in turn led to the Arab Revolt against the Ottomans. During the Arab Revolt of 1916–18, Abdullah commanded the Arab Eastern Army. Abdullah began his role in the Revolt by attacking the Ottoman garrison at Ta'if on 10 June 1916. The garrison consisted of 3,000 men with ten 75-mm Krupp guns. Abdullah led a force of 5,000 tribesmen, but they did not have the weapons or discipline for a full attack. Instead, he laid siege to town. In July, he received reinforcements from Egypt in the form of howitzer batteries manned by Egyptian personnel. He then joined the siege of Medina commanding a force of 4,000 men based to the east and north-east of the town. In early 1917, Abdullah ambushed an Ottoman convoy in the desert, and captured £20,000 worth of gold coins that were intended to bribe the Bedouin into loyalty to the Sultan. In August 1917, Abdullah worked closely with the French Captain Muhammand Ould Ali Raho in sabotaging the Hejaz Railway. Abdullah's relations with the British Captain T. E. Lawrence were not good, and as a result, Lawrence spent most of his time in the Hejaz serving with Abdullah's brother, Faisal, who commanded the Arab Northern Army.

Founding of the Emirate of Transjordan

When French forces captured Damascus after the Battle of Maysalun (24 July 1920) and expelled his brother Faisal (27 July–1 August 1920), Abdullah moved his forces from Hejaz into Transjordan with a view to liberating Damascus, where his brother had been proclaimed King in 1918. Having heard of Abdullah's plans, Winston Churchill invited Abdullah to Cairo in 1921 for a famous "tea party", where he convinced Abdullah to stay put and not attack Britain's allies, the French. Churchill told Abdullah that French forces were superior to his and that the British did not want any trouble with the French. On 8 March 1920, Abdullah was proclaimed King of Iraq by the Iraqi Congress but he refused the position. After his refusal, his brother Faisal who had just been defeated in Syria, accepted the position. Abdullah headed to Transjordan and established an emirate there after being welcomed into the country by its inhabitants.

Although Abdullah established a legislative council in 1928, its role remained advisory, leaving him to rule as an autocrat. Prime Ministers under Abdullah formed 18 governments during the 23 years of the Emirate.

Abdullah set about the task of building Transjordan with the help of a reserve force headed by Lieutenant-Colonel Frederick Peake, who was seconded from the Palestine police in 1921. The force, renamed the Arab Legion in 1923, was led by John Bagot Glubb between 1930 and 1956. During World War II, Abdullah was a faithful British ally, maintaining strict order within Transjordan, and helping to suppress a pro-Axis uprising in Iraq. The Arab Legion assisted in the occupation of Iraq and Syria.

Abdullah negotiated with Britain to gain independence. On 25 May 1946, the Hashemite Kingdom of Transjordan (renamed the Hashemite Kingdom of Jordan on 26 April 1949) was proclaimed independent. On the same day, Abdullah was crowned king in Amman.

Expansionist aspirations

 
Abdullah, alone among the Arab leaders of his generation, was considered a moderate by the West. It is possible that he might have been willing to sign a separate peace agreement with Israel, but for the Arab League's militant opposition. Because of his dream for a Greater Syria within the borders of what was then Transjordan, Syria, Lebanon, and the British Mandate for Palestine under a Hashemite dynasty with "a throne in Damascus," many Arab countries distrusted Abdullah and saw him as both "a threat to the independence of their countries and they also suspected him of being in cahoots with the enemy" and in return, Abdullah distrusted the leaders of other Arab countries.

Abdullah supported the Peel Commission in 1937, which proposed that Palestine be split up into a small Jewish state (20 percent of the British Mandate for Palestine) and the remaining land be annexed into Transjordan. The Arabs within Palestine and the surrounding Arab countries objected to the Peel Commission while the Jews accepted it reluctantly. Ultimately, the Peel Commission was not adopted. In 1947, when the UN supported partition of Palestine into one Jewish and one Arab state, Abdullah was the only Arab leader supporting the decision.<ref
 name=EB/>

In 1946–48, Abdullah actually supported partition in order that the Arab allocated areas of the British Mandate for Palestine could be annexed into Transjordan. Abdullah went so far as to have secret meetings with the Jewish Agency for Israel (Golda Meyerson, the future Israeli Prime Minister Golda Meir, was among the delegates to these meetings) that came to a mutually agreed upon partition plan independently of the United Nations in November 1947. On 17 November 1947, in a secret meeting with Meir, Abdullah stated that he wished to annex all of the Arab parts as a minimum, and would prefer to annex all of Palestine. This partition plan was supported by British Foreign Secretary Ernest Bevin who preferred to see Abdullah's territory increased at the expense of the Palestinians rather than risk the creation of a Palestinian state headed by the Mufti of Jerusalem Mohammad Amin al-Husayni.

 
Historian Graham Jevon discusses the Shlaim and Karsh interpretations of the critical meeting and accepts that there may not have been a "firm agreement" as posited by Shlaim while claiming it is clear that the parties openly discussed the possibility of a Hashemite-Zionist accommodation and further says it is "indisputable" that the Zionists confirmed that they were willing to accept Abdullah's intention.

On 4 May 1948, Abdullah, as a part of the effort to seize as much of Palestine as possible, sent in the Arab Legion to attack the Israeli settlements in the Etzion Bloc. Less than a week before the outbreak of the 1948 Arab–Israeli War, Abdullah met with Meir for one last time on 11 May 1948. Abdullah told Meir, "Why are you in such a hurry to proclaim your state? Why don't you wait a few years? I will take over the whole country and you will be represented in my parliament. I will treat you very well and there will be no war". Abdullah proposed to Meir the creation "of an autonomous Jewish canton within a Hashemite kingdom," but "Meir countered back that in November, they had agreed on a partition with Jewish statehood." Depressed by the unavoidable war that would come between Jordan and the Yishuv, one Jewish Agency representative wrote, "[Abdullah] will not remain faithful to the 29 November [UN Partition] borders, but [he] will not attempt to conquer all of our state [either]." Abdullah too found the coming war to be unfortunate, in part because he "preferred a Jewish state [as Transjordan's neighbour] to a Palestinian Arab state run by the mufti."

The Palestinian Arabs, the neighbouring Arab states, the promise of the expansion of territory and the goal to conquer Jerusalem finally pressured Abdullah into joining them in an "all-Arab military intervention" on 15 May 1948. He used the military intervention to restore his prestige in the Arab world, which had grown suspicious of his relatively good relationship with Western and Jewish leaders. Abdullah was especially anxious to take Jerusalem as compensation for the loss of the guardianship of Mecca, which had traditionally been held by the Hashemites until Ibn Saud seized the Hejaz in 1925. Abdullah's role in this war became substantial. He distrusted the leaders of the other Arab nations and thought they had weak military forces; the other Arabs distrusted Abdullah in return. He saw himself as the "supreme commander of the Arab forces" and "persuaded the Arab League to appoint him" to this position. His forces under their British commander Glubb Pasha did not approach the area set aside for the Jewish state, though they clashed with the Yishuv forces around Jerusalem, intended to be an international zone. According to Abdullah el-Tell it was the King's personal intervention that led to the Arab Legion entering the Old City against Glubb's wishes.

Assassination

On 16 July 1951, Riad Bey Al Solh, a former Prime Minister of Lebanon, had been assassinated in Amman, where rumours were circulating that Lebanon and Jordan were discussing a joint separate peace with Israel.

96 hours later, on 20 July 1951, while visiting Al-Aqsa Mosque in Jerusalem, Abdullah was shot dead by a Palestinian from the Husseini clan, who had passed through apparently heavy security. Contemporary media reports attributed the assassination to a secret order based in Jerusalem known only as "the Jihad", discussed in the context of the Muslim Brotherhood. Abdullah was in Jerusalem to give a eulogy at the funeral and for a prearranged meeting with Reuven Shiloah and Moshe Sasson. He was shot while attending Friday prayers at Al-Aqsa Mosque in the company of his grandson, Prince Hussein. The Palestinian gunman fired three fatal bullets into the King's head and chest. Prince Hussein was hit too but a medal that had been pinned to Hussein's chest at his grandfather's insistence deflected the bullet and saved his life. Abdullah's assassination was said to have influenced Hussein not to enter peace talks with Israel in the aftermath of the Six-Day War in order to avoid a similar fate.

The assassin, who was shot dead by the king's bodyguards, was a 21-year-old tailor's apprentice named Mustafa Shukri Ashu. According to Alec Kirkbride, the British Resident in Amman, Ashu was a "former terrorist", recruited for the assassination by Zakariyya Ukah, a livestock dealer and butcher.

Ashu was killed; the revolver used to kill the king was found on his body, as well as a talisman with "Kill, thou shalt be safe" written on it in Arabic. The son of a local coffee shop owner named Abdul Qadir Farhat identified the revolver as belonging to his father. On 11 August, the Prime Minister of Jordan announced that ten men would be tried in connection with the assassination. These suspects included Colonel Abdullah at-Tell, who had been Governor of Jerusalem, and several others including Musa Ahmad al-Ayubbi, a Jerusalem vegetable merchant who had fled to Egypt in the days following the assassination. General Abdul Qadir Pasha Al Jundi of the Arab Legion was to preside over the trial, which began on 18 August. Ayubbi and at-Tell, who had fled to Egypt, were tried and sentenced in absentia. Three of the suspects, including Musa Abdullah Husseini, were from the prominent Palestinian Husseini family, leading to speculation that the assassins were part of a mandate-era opposition group.

The Jordanian prosecutor asserted that Colonel el-Tell, who had been living in Cairo since January 1950, had given instructions that the killer, made to act alone, be slain at once thereafter, to shield the instigators of the crime. Jerusalem sources added that Col. el-Tell had been in close contact with the former Grand Mufti of Jerusalem, Amin al-Husayni, and his adherents in the Kingdom of Egypt and in the All-Palestine protectorate in Gaza. El-Tell and Husseini, and three co-conspirators from Jerusalem, were sentenced to death. On 6 September 1951, Musa Ali Husseini, 'Abid and Zakariyya Ukah, and Abd-el-Qadir Farhat were executed by hanging.

Abdullah is buried at the Royal Court in Amman. He was succeeded by his son Talal; however, since Talal was mentally ill, Talal's son Prince Hussein became the effective ruler as King Hussein at the age of sixteen, three months before his 17th birthday. In 1967, el-Tell received a full pardon from King Hussein.

Succession crisis
Emir Abdullah I had two sons: future King Talal and Prince Naif. Talal, being the eldest son, was considered the "natural heir to the throne". However, Talal's troubled relationship with his father led Emir Abdullah to remove him from the line of succession in a secret royal decree during World War II. Subsequently, their relationship improved after the Second World War and Talal was publicly declared heir apparent by the Emir.
Tension between Emir Abdullah and then-Prince Talal continued, however, after Talal had been "compiling huge, unexplainable debts". Both Emir Abdullah and Prime Minister Samir Al-Rifai were in favor of Talal's removal as heir apparent and replacement with his brother Naif. However, the British resident Alec Kirkbride warned Emir Abdullah against such a "public rebuke of the heir to the throne", a warning which Emir Abdullah reluctantly accepted and then proceeded to appoint Talal as regent when the Emir was on leave.

A major reason for the British's reluctance to allow the replacement of Talal is his well-publicized anti-British stance which caused the majority of Jordanians to assume that Kirkbride would favor the vigorously pro-British prince Naif. Thus, Kirkbride is said to have reasoned that Naif's "accession would have been attributed by many Arabs to a Machiavellian plot on the part of the British government to exclude their enemy Talal", an assumption that would give the Arab nationalist sympathetic public an impression that Britain still actively interfered in the affairs of newly independent Jordan. Such assumption would disturb British interests as it may lead to renewed calls to remove British forces and fully remove British influence from the country.

This assumption would be put to a test when Kirkbride sent Talal to a Beirut mental hospital, stating that Talal was suffering from severe mental illness. Many Jordanians believed that there was "nothing wrong with Talal and that the wily British fabricated the story about his madness in order to get him out of the way." Because of widespread popular opinion of Talal, Prince Naif was not given British support to succeed the Emir.

The conflicts between his two sons led Emir Abdullah to seek a secret union with Hashemite Iraq, in which Abdullah's nephew Faisal II would rule Jordan after Abdullah's death. This idea received some positive reception among the British, but ultimately rejected as Baghdad's domination of Jordan was viewed as unfavorable by the British Foreign Office due to fear of "Arab republicanism".

With the two other possible claimants to the throne sidelined by the British (Prince Naif and King Faisal II of Iraq), Talal was poised to rule as king of Jordan upon Emir Abdullah's assassination in 1951. However, as King Talal was receiving medical treatment abroad, Prince Naif was allowed to act as regent in his brother's place. Soon enough, Prince Naif began "openly expressing his designs on the throne for himself". Upon hearing of plans to bring King Talal back to Jordan, Prince Naif attempted to stage a coup d'état by having Colonel Habis Majali, commander of the 10th Infantry Regiment (described by Avi Shlaim as a "quasi-Praetorian Guard"), surround the palace of Queen Zein (wife of Talal) and "the building where the government was to meet in order to force it to crown Nayef".

The coup, if it was a coup at all, failed due to lack of British support and because of the interference of Glubb Pasha to stop it. Prince Naif left with his family to Beirut, his royal court advisor Mohammed Shureiki left his post, and the 10th Infantry Regiment was disbanded. Finally, King Talal assumed full duties as the successor of Abdullah when he returned to Jordan on 6 September 1951.

Marriages and children
Abdullah married three times.

In 1904, Abdullah married his first wife, Musbah bint Nasser (1884 – 15 March 1961), at Stinia Palace, İstinye, Istanbul, Ottoman Empire. She was a daughter of Emir Nasser Pasha and his wife, Dilber Khanum. They had three children:

 Princess Haya (1907–1990). Married Abdul-Karim Ja'afar Zeid Dhaoui.
 King Talal (26 February 1909 – 7 July 1972).
 Princess Munira (1915–1987). Never married.

In 1913, Abdullah married his second wife, Suzdil Khanum (d. 16 August 1968), in Istanbul, Turkey. They had two children:
 Prince Nayef bin Abdullah (14 November 1914 – 12 October 1983; a colonel of the Royal Jordanian Land Force. Regent for his older half-brother, Talal, from 20 July to 3 September 1951). Married in Cairo or Amman on 7 October 1940 Princess Mihrimah Sultan (11 November 1922 – March 2000, Amman, and buried in Istanbul on 2 April 2000), daughter of the Ottoman prince, Şehzade Mehmed Ziyaeddin (1873–1938) and his fifth consort, Neşemend Hanım (1905–1934), and paternal granddaughter of Mehmed V through his first consort.
 Princess Maqbula (6 February 1921 – 1 January 2001); married Hussein ibn Nasser, Prime Minister of Jordan (terms 1963–64, 1967).

In 1949, Abdullah married his third wife, Nahda bint Uman, a lady from Anglo-Egyptian Sudan, in Amman. They had one child:
 Princess Naifeh (1950–); married Sameer Hilal Ashour.

Ancestry

Honours
  Francoist Spain: Grand Cross of the Order of Military Merit (with white distinctive), (1949)

Gallery

Notes

Bibliography
 Alon, Yoav.  The Shaykh of Shayks: Mithqal al-Fayiz and Tribal Leadership in Modern Jordan, Stanford Univ. Press, 2016. 
 Bickerton, Ian J., and Carla L. Klausner. A Concise History of the Arab-Israeli Conflict.  4th ed. Upper Saddle River: Prentice Hall, 2002.
 
 
 
 
 
 Hiro, Dilip (1996). "Abdullah ibn Hussein al Hashem". Dictionary of the Middle East. New York: St. Martin's Press. pp. 3–4.
 
 
  No Google Books access.
 see also the 2014 Bloomsbury Publishing edition, 
 
  See also W. Morrow 1989 edition, .
 Morris, Benny (2008).  1948: The History of the First Arab-Israeli War. New Haven: Yale University Press
 
 Oren, Michael (2003). Six Days of War: June 1967 and the Making of the Modern Middle East. New York: Ballantine.  pp. 5, 7.
 

 Shlaim, Avi. "Israel and the Arab coalition in 1948". pp. 79–103.
 Rogan, Eugene L.  "Jordan and 1948: the persistence of an official history". pp. 104–124.
 Tripp, Charles. "Iraq and the 1948 War: mirror of Iraq's disorder". pp. 125–150.
 Landis, Joshua. "Syria and the Palestine War: fighting King 'Abdullah's 'Greater Syria plan'". pp. 178–205.
 
 
 Sela, Avraham, ed. (2002). The Continuum Political Encyclopedia of the Middle East. New York: Continuum.
 Sela, "Abdallah Ibn Hussein". pp. 13–14.
 "al-Husseini, Hajj (Muhammad) Amin". pp. 360–362.
 
 Shlaim, Avi (1990). The Politics of Partition; King Abdullah, the Zionists and Palestine 1921–1951 . Columbia University Press. .
 Shlaim, Avi (2007). Lion of Jordan; The life of King Hussein in War and Peace. Allen Lane 
 Thornhill, Michael T. (2004). Abdullah ibn Hussein (1882–1951). Oxford Dictionary of National Biography, Oxford University Press; online edn, Jan 2008. Retrieved 10 March 2009.
 Wilson, Mary Christina (1990). King Abdullah, Britain and the Making of Jordan. Cambridge University Press. .

Further reading

External links

 A genealogical profile of him
 

1882 births
1951 deaths
Dhawu Awn
People from Mecca
Kings of Jordan
House of Hashim
Field marshals of Egypt
World War II political leaders
20th-century murdered monarchs
Assassinated Jordanian people
Assassinated heads of state
Emirate of Transjordan people
Muslim monarchs
Politicians of the Ottoman Empire

Honorary Knights Grand Cross of the Order of St Michael and St George
Honorary Knights Grand Cross of the Order of the British Empire
Jordanian people of the 1948 Arab–Israeli War
Jordanian independence activists
1950s murders in Jordan
1951 crimes in Jordan
20th-century Jordanian people
21st-century Jordanian people
People of the Arab Revolt